Franklin Walter Mulvey (1918 – May 3, 1981) was a Canadian football player who played for the Winnipeg Blue Bombers. He won the Grey Cup with them in 1939 and 1941. He died in 1981.

References

1918 births
1981 deaths
Canadian football ends
Canadian football people from Winnipeg
Players of Canadian football from Manitoba
Winnipeg Blue Bombers players